The 1953–54 Indiana Hoosiers men's basketball team represented Indiana University. Their head coach was Branch McCracken, who was in his 13th year. The team played its home games in The Fieldhouse in Bloomington, Indiana, and was a member of the Big Ten Conference.

As reigning national champions, the Hoosiers finished the regular season with an overall record of 20–4 and a conference record of 12–2, finishing 1st in the Big Ten Conference. As Big Ten Conference Champions, Indiana was invited to participate in the NCAA tournament, where they advanced to Regional Third Place.

Roster

Schedule/Results

|-
!colspan=8| Regular Season
|-

|-
!colspan=8| NCAA tournament

Rankings

References

Indiana
Indiana
Indiana Hoosiers men's basketball seasons
1953 in sports in Indiana
1954 in sports in Indiana